Breakfast with Scot is a 2007 Canadian comedy film. It is adapted from the 1999 novel by Tufts University professor Michael Downing.

The screenplay was adapted by Sean Reycraft from the book by Michael Downing, and the film was directed by Laurie Lynd. The film attracted significant press attention in 2006, when the National Hockey League and the Toronto Maple Leafs announced that they had approved the use of the team's logo and uniforms in the film. Breakfast with Scot was the first gay-themed film ever to receive this type of approval from a professional sports league.

In early 2007, several months before the film's release, an excerpt was screened at Toronto's Inside Out Film and Video Festival as an advance preview, alongside Lynd's earlier short films RSVP and The Fairy Who Didn't Want to Be a Fairy Anymore.

Plot
Eric McNally (Tom Cavanagh) is a gay retired hockey player turned television sportscaster who lives with his partner Sam (Ben Shenkman), a sports lawyer. When Sam unexpectedly becomes the legal guardian of his brother's stepson, Scot (Noah Bernett), their lives are turned upside down as the demands of being a parent, as well as the boy's preference for clothing and hobbies counteract the heteronormative clothing wear that typical boys wear, begin to intrude on Eric's desire to remain closeted at work. As Eric and his partner Sam try to teach Scot how to be a stereotypical boy to prevent bullying at school, Scot completely changes his identity.

Over time, Eric's unwillingness to accept the situation eventually fades as Scot teaches Eric about loving your true self and accepting one's identity.

Cast

Awards
The film won the Globola Audience Award for the best international movie at the Lesbisch Schwule Filmtage Hamburg (Hamburg International Queer Film Festival) in October 2008.

It also won the Family Feature Film award from the Directors Guild of Canada, November 2008.

Reception
Lou Lumenick of the New York Post said the film was "so bland and timid", but "well intentioned".

One evangelical Christian group, the Canada Family Action Coalition, responded to the film with anger, calling for a boycott of Maple Leaf Sports and Entertainment (MLSE).

References

External links
 
 
 
 

2000s sports comedy films
2007 comedy films
2007 films
2007 LGBT-related films
Canadian sports comedy films
Canadian ice hockey films
Canadian LGBT-related films
2000s English-language films
Films based on American novels
Films directed by Laurie Lynd
Films set in Toronto
Gay-related films
LGBT-related sports comedy films
2000s Canadian films